Angelo Davids (born 1 June 1999) is a South African rugby sevens player for the South Africa national rugby sevens team, where his regular position is wing and back. He also plays for the DHL Stormers in super rugby and the Western Province in the currie cup.

Biography 
Davids attended Stellenberg High School in Bellville, where he earned a selection into 's squad for the 2017 Craven Week competition.

Davids joined the South African Rugby Sevens Academy in 2018, right after finishing school. He represented the South African Academy side in various tournaments in 2018 and 2019, and was selected to represent the senior side at the 2018 Hong Kong Sevens before withdrawing through injury.

He featured in all their matches in that tournament, as well as at the 2019 Singapore Sevens, where he scored his first try in their opener against Scotland, and another in the Cup final match against Fiji, which saw Davids being named as the Player of the Final in a 20–19 victory.

In 2022, He was part of the South African team that won their second Commonwealth Games gold medal.

References

External links
 

South African rugby union players
Living people
1999 births
Sportspeople from Cape Town
Rugby union wings
South Africa international rugby sevens players
Rugby sevens players at the 2020 Summer Olympics
Olympic rugby sevens players of South Africa
Stormers players
Western Province (rugby union) players
Rugby sevens players at the 2022 Commonwealth Games
Commonwealth Games gold medallists for South Africa
Commonwealth Games medallists in rugby sevens
Medallists at the 2022 Commonwealth Games